The Roman Catholic Diocese of Gokwe is a suffragan diocese in the city of Gokwe in the ecclesiastical province of Harare in Zimbabwe.

History
 June 17, 1991: Established as Diocese of Gokwe from Diocese of Hwange

Bishops
 Michael Dixon Bhasera (17 June 1991 – 9 February 1999)
 Ángel Floro Martínez, IEME (15 October 1999 – 28 April 2017)
Rudolf Nyandoro (29 April 2017 – 2020)

See also
Catholic Church in Zimbabwe

References

Sources
 GCatholic.org
 

Roman Catholic dioceses in Zimbabwe
Roman Catholic dioceses established in 1991
1991 establishments in Zimbabwe
Roman Catholic Ecclesiastical Province of Harare